Kanpur Wale Khuranas is an Indian Hindi comedy show that talks about the highlights of 2018. Celebrities who made news in the year will be seen interacting with the Khurana family. The show is broadcast on Star Plus. The show, premiered on December 15, 2018.

Cast
Sunil Grover as Pramod Kumar
Adaa Khan as Mrs. Pramod Kumar
Aparshakti Khurana as Host, Pramod's brother-in-law
 Jatinder Suri (actor) as Pramod's sister-in-law
Ali Asgar as Pramod's sister-in-law
Sugandha Mishra as Pramod's sister-in-law
Upasana Singh as Pramod's sister-in-law
Farah Khan as neighbour of Khuranas

List of episodes

References 

StarPlus original programming
2018 Indian television series debuts
Indian television sketch shows
Hindi-language television shows
2019 Indian television series endings